is a Japanese film directed by Yu Irie. It was released on March 14, 2009.

Cast
Eita Okuno
Hikohiko Sugiyama
Mihiro
Ryusuke Komakine
Shingo Mizusawa
Tatsuya Masunari

Reception
It won the Grand Prize at the 2009 Yubari International Fantastic Film Festival. Tom Mes of Midnight Eye wrote that "Irie has a great eye for landscape, colour and composition, filming most of his scenes in single takes with barely any close-ups, cutaways or reaction shots."

References

External links

Japanese drama films
Films directed by Yu Irie
2000s Japanese films